Pseudohiatula cyatheae is a species of fungus in the family Physalacriaceae, and the type species of the genus Pseudohiatula. The species was first described by mycologist Rolf Singer in 1938.

References

External links

Physalacriaceae
Fungi described in 1938
Taxa named by Rolf Singer